Sydney Francis Ashby (31 December 1874, Rock Ferry, Cheshire, UK – 6 March 1954, Sussex) was a British mycologist and phytopathologist. He published on the genus Phytophthora.

Biography
He was christened on 20 March 1875 in St Paul's Church, Tranmere. He had three sisters. His parents were Augustus Francis Ashby, an artist, and Priscilla Mary Ashby, the daughter of an officer in the Royal Navy. Sydney Francis Ashby studied at the University of Liverpool and then at the University of Edinburgh, where he graduated with a B.Sc. After his graduation he studied at the Martin Luther University of Halle-Wittenberg and the University of Göttingen and spent some time in Denmark studying bacteria that live in water. After his return to the UK, he became a Carnegie Research Fellow, working under Alfred Daniel Hall at the Rothamsted Experimental Station. From 1906 to 1910 and again from 1912 to February 1922 he was a microbiologist employed by the Department of Agriculture, Jamaica, which was part of the Imperial Agricultural Department for the West Indies. For some years, the director of Ashby's department was the chemist Herbert Henry Cousins (1893–1950). On 10 January 1910 Ashby married Caroline Louise Cork in Saint Catherine Parish, Jamaica. From 1910 to 1912 Ashby studied in London. His return to Jamaica in 1912 was in response to an outbreak among banana plants of Panama disease, a wilt disease caused by the fungus Fusarium oxysporum f. sp. cubense (Foc). In January 1912, Ashby published a valuable account concerning banana diseases and recommendations for the control of such diseases.

For around five years from 1921 to 1926, Ashby was a professor of mycology at the Imperial College of Tropical Agriculture, Trinidad. In April 1926 he returned to the UK to become a senior mycologist at the Imperial Bureau of Mycology (now called the International Mycological Institute). Upon the resignation of Sir Edwin John Butler in 1935, Ashby was appointed the director of the Imperial Mycological Institute (now called the International Mycological Institute). He held the directorship until his retirement in 1939.

Early in WWII, he and his wife suffered the loss of a son, who served in the RAF and was killed in his first operational flight as an observer. When Sydney Francis Ashby died in 1964, he was survived by his widow and one of their two sons.

Ashby's fungal specimens are stored at the International Mycological Institue. His botanical specimens are stored at the Tolson Museum in Huddersfield.

Selected publications

Articles
 
 
 
 
 
  abstract
 
 
 
  abstract
 
 
 
 
  abstract
  abstract

References

1874 births
1954 deaths
British microbiologists
British mycologists
British phytopathologists